Eleutherodactylus montanus is a species of frogs in the family Eleutherodactylidae endemic to the Cordillera Central, Dominican Republic, at elevations of  asl. Its common name is Dominican mountain robber frog. Its natural habitat is closed-canopy forest and forest remnants. It is typically found in the fern understorey; males call from low vegetation. It is threatened by habitat loss caused by agriculture and by disturbance from ecotourism.

References

montanus
Endemic fauna of the Dominican Republic
Amphibians of the Dominican Republic
Amphibians described in 1919
Taxonomy articles created by Polbot